The olive-flanked ground robin (Cossypha anomala), also known as the olive-flanked robin-chat, is a species of bird in the family Muscicapidae.  It is found in Malawi, and Mozambique.  Its natural habitat is tropical moist montane forests.

References

olive-flanked ground robin
Birds of East Africa
olive-flanked ground robin
Taxonomy articles created by Polbot
Taxobox binomials not recognized by IUCN